The Sardinian Crimean War Medal or, more formally, the silver medal for Military Valour for the Eastern Expedition 1855–1856 was a gallantry medal awarded by King Victor Emmanuel II of Sardinia for bravery during the Crimean War (1855–1856) against the Russian Empire. It is a variant of the Sardinian Medal of Military Valor.

Ribbon and medal 
A silver medal with a blue watered ribbon.  The obverse shows a crown with laurel and palm branch surrounding the arms of Savoy, with the inscription "Al Valore Militare". The reverse is inscribed "Spedizione d'Oriente 1854–1856" outside a laurel wreath, with the name, rank and unit of the recipient usually engraved within the wreath.

In addition to awards to the Sardinian Expeditionary Corps and other allied soldiers, the medal was awarded to 450 specially selected officers and men of the Royal Navy and British Army. Queen Victoria gave permission for the medal to be worn by British servicemen in uniform.

See also 
British Crimean War Medal
Turkish Order of the Medjidie
Turkish Crimea Medal
Baltic Medal
Légion d'honneur
Médaille militaire

Notes

External links

Military awards and decorations of Italy
Crimean War
Awards established in 1856
1856 establishments in the Kingdom of Sardinia